Lesbian, gay, bisexual, and transgender (LGBT) persons in Uganda face legal challenges, active discrimination and stigmatisation not experienced by non-LGBT residents. Both male and female homosexual activity are illegal in Uganda. Under the Penal Code, "carnal knowledge against the order of nature" between two males carries a potential penalty of life imprisonment.

LGBT people continue to face major discrimination in Uganda, actively encouraged by political and religious leaders. Violent and brutal attacks against LGBT people are common, often performed by state officials. Households headed by same-sex couples are not eligible for the same legal protections available to opposite-sex couples. Same-sex marriage has been constitutionally banned since 2005.

Homosexual relations were accepted and commonplace in pre-colonial Ugandan society. The British Empire introduced laws punishing homosexuality when Uganda became a British colony. These laws were kept after independence.

The Uganda Anti-Homosexuality Act, 2014 was passed in 2013 and annulled in 2014. The Act carried a punishment of life in prison for "aggravated homosexuality". The law brought Uganda into the international spotlight, and caused international outrage, with many governments refusing to provide further aid to Uganda. In May 2021, the outgoing parliament passed further criminalization laws on both sex work and same-sex sexual activity.

History

Similarly to neighbouring Kenya, Rwanda and Burundi, male homosexual relations were quite common in pre-colonial Ugandan society. Among the Baganda, Uganda's largest ethnic group, homosexuality was usually treated with indifference. King Mwanga II of Buganda was famously bisexual, known to have regular sexual relations with women, having had a total of 16 wives, as well as his male subjects whom he abused without their consent. During his reign, he increasingly regarded the Christian missionaries and the European colonial powers, notably the British, as threats.

Mwanga II took a more aggressive approach than other African leaders, choosing to expel all missionaries and insist that Christian and Muslim converts abandon their faith or face death. The Luganda term  refers to homosexuals, though usage nowadays is commonly pejorative. The Baganda were not the only ethnic group known to engage in homosexual acts. Among the Lango people, mudoko dako individuals were believed to form a "third gender" alongside male and female. The  were effeminate men, mostly treated by Langi society as women and could marry other men without social sanctions. Homosexuality was also acknowledged among the Teso, Bahima, Banyoro, and Karamojong peoples. Societal acceptance disappeared after the arrival of the British and the creation of the Protectorate of Uganda.

Presently, there is widespread denial that homosexuality was practised before colonisation. Furthermore, the false belief that homosexuality is "un-African" or "Western" is quite prevalent in Ugandan society.

The term , of Swahili origin, is increasingly used by the Ugandan LGBT community. A documentary film, Call Me Kuchu, was released in 2012, focusing in part on the 2011 murder of LGBT activist David Kato.

Legality and rights 
Laws prohibiting same-sex sexual acts were first put in place under British colonial rule. Those laws were enshrined in the Penal Code Act 1950 and retained following independence. The following sections of that Act are relevant:
Section 145. Unnatural offences. Any person who—
(a) has carnal knowledge of any person against the order of nature; [or]
(b) has carnal knowledge of an animal; or
(c) permits a male person to have carnal knowledge of him or her against the order of nature,
commits an offence and is liable to imprisonment for life.

Section 146. Attempt to commit unnatural offences. Any person who attempts to commit any of the offences specified in section 145 commits a felony and is liable to imprisonment for seven years.

Section 148. Indecent practices. Any person who, whether in public or in private, commits any act of gross indecency with another person or procures another person to commit any act of gross indecency with him or her or attempts to procure the commission of any such act by any person with himself or herself or with another person, whether in public or in private, commits an offence and is liable to imprisonment for seven years.

Before the Penal Code Amendment (Gender References) Act 2000 was enacted, only same-sex acts between men were criminalized. In 2000, that Act was passed and changed references to "any male" to "any person" so that grossly indecent acts between women were criminalized as well, and are now punishable by up to seven years imprisonment. The Act also extended this criminalizing such acts to both homosexuals and heterosexuals. This effectively outlawed both oral sex and anal sex, regardless of sexual orientation, under the Penal Code. Conservative evangelical Christian missionaries have had significant influence on the passage of anti-LGBT legislation in Uganda.

Anti-Homosexuality Act 

On 13 October 2009, Member of Parliament David Bahati introduced the Anti-Homosexuality Act, 2009, which would broaden the criminalization of same-sex relationships in Uganda and introduce the death penalty for serial offenders, HIV-positive people who engage in sexual activity with people of the same sex, and persons who engage in same-sex sexual acts with people under 18 years of age. Individuals or companies that promote LGBT rights would be fined or imprisoned, or both. Persons "in authority" would be required to report any offence under the Act within 24 hours or face up to three years' imprisonment.

In November 2012, Parliament Speaker Rebecca Kadaga promised to pass a revised anti-homosexuality law in December 2012. "Ugandans want that law as a Christmas gift. They have asked for it, and we'll give them that gift." The Parliament, however, adjourned in December 2012 without acting on the bill. The bill passed on 17 December 2013 with a punishment of life in prison instead of the death penalty for "aggravated homosexuality", and the new law was promulgated in February 2014.

In June 2014, in response to the passing of this Act, the American State Department announced several sanctions, including, among others, cuts to funding, blocking certain Ugandan officials from entering the country, cancelling aviation exercises in Uganda and supporting Ugandan LGBT NGOs.

In August 2014, Uganda's Constitutional Court annulled this law on a technicality because not enough lawmakers were present to vote.

On March 9, 2023, Asuman Basalirwa, a member of parliament, introduced the 2023 Anti-Homosexuality Bill in Parliament. The bill is a revised and more egregious version of the 2014 Anti-Homosexuality Act, which reinforced existing prison sentences for same-sex conduct and outlawed the “promotion of homosexuality,” but was struck down by a court on procedural grounds. The bill, if passed would criminalize any person who “holds out as a lesbian, gay, transgender, a queer, or any other sexual or gender identity that is contrary to the binary categories of male and female,” with a punishment of up to ten years in prison.

Constitutional provisions

Article 21 of the Ugandan Constitution, "Equality and freedom from discrimination", guarantees protection against discriminatory legislation for all citizens. It may be that because existing criminal law addresses sodomy (oral and anal sex), and applies to all genders, that it may not be in violation of Article 21, unlike the Anti-Homosexuality Act.

On 22 December 2008, the Ugandan High Court ruled that Articles 23, 24, and 27 of the Uganda Constitution apply to all people, regardless of their sexual orientation or gender identity or expression. Article 23 states that "No person shall be deprived of personal liberty." Article 24 states that "No person shall be subjected to any form of torture, cruel, inhuman or degrading treatment or punishment." Article 27 states that "No person shall be subjected to: (a) unlawful search of the person, home or other property of that person; or (b) unlawful entry by others of the premises of that person or property. No person shall be subjected to interference with the privacy of that person's home, correspondence, communication or other property."

In November 2016, the Constitutional Court of Uganda ruled that a provision in the Equal Opportunities Commission Act was unconstitutional. This provision effectively barred the commission from investigating "any matter involving behaviour which is considered to be immoral and socially harmful, or unacceptable by the majority of the cultural and social communities in Uganda." The court ruled that the section breaches the right to a fair hearing and as well as the rights of minorities, as guaranteed in the Constitution.

The court also ruled that Uganda's Parliament cannot create a class of "social misfits who are referred to as immoral, harmful and unacceptable" and cannot legislate the discrimination of such persons. Following the ruling, Maria Burnett, Human Rights Watch Associate Director for East Africa, said: "Because of their work, all Ugandans should now be able to bring cases of discrimination – against their employers who fired or harassed them, or landlords who kicked them out of their homes – and finally receive a fair hearing before the commission."

Recognition of same-sex relationships 
On 29 September 2005, President Yoweri Museveni signed a constitutional amendment prohibiting same-sex marriage. Clause 2a of Section 31 states: "Marriage between persons of the same sex is prohibited."

Recognition of transgender identity 
In October 2021, trans woman Cleopatra Kambugu Kentaro was issued new ID identifying her as female. She is the first Ugandan to have a change of gender legally recognized.

Further 2021 criminalization attempts

In May 2021, the outgoing parliament passed the Sexual Offenses Bill, 2019, further criminalizing sex work and gay sex in the final days of its last session.
The incoming government indicated that it would not grant assent to the bill, meaning that it would not become law. On 29 July 2021, petitions by gay and human rights activists arose to President Museveni not to sign another bill into law which would further criminalize gay sex, stating that it could increase violent attacks even to people suspected of being gay. In August 2021, President Museveni confirmed that he would not sign the bill into law at this time, suggesting much of its content is already covered by existing legislation and sending it back to Parliament to address these redundancies. Museveni reportedly also had concerns about foreign policy implications and democratic buy-in and felt it was not politically advantageous to sign it as he had already recently won re-election.

Living conditions

In 2004, the Uganda Broadcasting Council fined Radio Simba over $1,000 and forced it to issue a public apology after hosting homosexuals on a live talk show. The council's chairman, Godfrey Mutabazi, said the programme "is contrary to public morality and is not in compliance with the existing law". Information Minister Nsaba Buturo said the measure reflected Ugandans' wish to uphold "God's moral values" and "We are not going to give them the opportunity to recruit others."

In 2005, Human Rights Watch reported on Uganda's abstinence until marriage programs. "By definition, ... [they] discriminate on the basis of sexual orientation. For young people who are lesbian, gay, bisexual, or transgender ... and cannot legally marry in Uganda ..., these messages imply, wrongly, that there is no safe way for them to have sex. They deny these people information that could save their lives. They also convey a message about the intrinsic wrongfulness of homosexual conduct that reinforces existing social stigma and prejudice to potentially devastating effect."

In June 2012, the Ugandan Government announced the ban of 38 non-governmental organizations (NGO) it accused of "promoting homosexuality" and "undermining the national culture". Simon Lokodo, the country's Minister of Ethics and Integrity, claimed the NGOs were "receiving support from abroad for Uganda's homosexuals and 'recruiting' young children into homosexuality." He also said that "they are encouraging homosexuality as if it is the best form of sexual behaviour." That same month, Lokodo ordered Ugandan police to break-up an LGBT rights workshop in Kampala. Later in the month, the Ugandan Government, in an apparent rebuke of Lokodo, announced that it will no longer attempt to break up meetings of LGBT rights groups.

The U.S. Department of State's 2011 human rights report found that:

LGBT persons faced discrimination and legal restrictions. It is illegal to engage in homosexual acts.... While no persons were convicted under the law [in 2011], the government arrested persons for related offenses. For example, in July police arrested an individual for "attempting" to engage in homosexual activities. On July 15, [2011,] a court in Entebbe charged him with "indecent practices" and released him on bail. Hearing of the case was pending at year's end.
LGBT persons were subject to societal harassment, discrimination, intimidation, and threats to their well-being [in 2011] and were denied access to health services. Discriminatory practices also prevented local LBGT NGOs from registering with the NGO Board and obtaining official NGO status....
On January 26, [2011,] LGBT activist David Kato, who had successfully sued the local tabloid discussed above for the 2010 publication of his picture under the headline "Hang Them," was bludgeoned to death at his home outside Kampala. On February 2, police arrested Sidney Enock Nsubuga for Kato's murder. On November 9, Nsubuga pled guilty and was sentenced to 30 years' imprisonment.
On October 3, [2011,] the Constitutional Court heard oral arguments on a 2009 petition filed by a local human rights and LGBT activists challenging the constitutionality of Section 15(6)(d) of the Equal Opportunities Commission Act. Section 15(6)(d) prevents the Equal Opportunities Commission from investigating "any matter involving behavior which is considered to be (i) immoral and socially harmful, or (ii) unacceptable by the majority of the cultural and social communities in Uganda." The petitioner argued that this clause is discriminatory and violates the constitutional rights of minority populations. A decision was pending at year's end.

A 2018 article in African Health Sciences said that Uganda's high HIV rate has "roots" in Uganda's stigma against same-sex sexual behavior and sex work.

In June 2021, a raid on the Happy Family Youth Shelter in Kampala resulted in forty-four arrests, police claiming that an illegal same-sex wedding was being held and that the participants were "doing a negligent act likely to spread infection of disease." Several of the detainees then alleged that police performed invasive anal examinations on them. Thirty-nine of the 44 were released on bail after several days in detention, with the trial scheduled for 8 July.

Violence and harassment 
Vigilante attacks, including harassment, beatings and murder occur. Both state and non-state actors are involved in targeting those perceived as LGBT. However, the United States Department of State considers that mob violence is prevalent in many circumstances in Uganda. It is directed at a range of socially disapproved individuals for actual or perceived wrongdoing, due, in the view of the State Department's report, to the community's lack of confidence in the police and judiciary. Extra-judicial police actions against LGBT individuals, such as arbitrary detention, beatings and psychological coercion, meet the United Nations criteria for torture.

Outings by newspapers 
In August 2006, a Ugandan newspaper, The Red Pepper, published a list of the first names and professions (or areas of work) of forty-five allegedly gay men.

In October 2010, the tabloid paper Rolling Stone published the full names, addresses, photographs, and preferred social-hangouts of 100 allegedly gay and lesbian Ugandans, accompanied by a call for their execution. David Kato, Kasha Jacqueline, and Pepe Julian Onziema, all members of the Civil Society Coalition On Human Rights and Constitutional Law, filed suit against the tabloid. A High Court judge in January 2011 issued a permanent injunction preventing Rolling Stone and its managing editor Giles Muhame from "any further publications of the identities of the persons and homes of the applicants and homosexuals generally".

The court further awarded USh  plus court costs to each of the plaintiffs. The judge ruled that the outing, and the accompanying incitation to violence, threatened the subjects' fundamental rights and freedoms, attacked their right to human dignity, and violated their constitutional right to privacy. Kato was murdered in 2011, shortly after winning the lawsuit.

LGBT rights activism

Despite the criminal laws and prevailing attitudes, the Government has not expressly banned Uganda residents from trying to change public policies and attitudes with regards to LGBT people.

The climate in Uganda is hostile to homosexuals; many political leaders have used openly anti-gay rhetoric, and have said that homosexuality is "akin to bestiality", was "brought to Uganda by white people" and is "un-African". Simon Lokodo, Minister for Ethics and Integrity, is known by Ugandan LGBT activists as "the country's main homophobe", has suggested that rape is more morally acceptable than consensual sex between people of the same sex, has accompanied violent police raids on LGBT events and actively suppresses freedom of speech and of assembly for LGBT people.

Uganda's main LGBT rights organization is Sexual Minorities Uganda, founded in 2004 by Victor Mukasa and has been allowed to conduct its activities without much government interference. Frank Mugisha is the executive director and the winner of both the 2011 Robert F. Kennedy Human Rights Award and the 2011 Rafto Prize for his work on behalf of LGBT rights in Uganda.

In late 2014, LGBT Ugandans published the first installment of Bombastic Magazine and launched the online platform Kuchu Times. These actions have been dubbed as a "Reclaiming The Media Campaign" by distinguished activist Kasha Jacqueline Nabagesera. She was awarded the Martin Ennals Award for Human Rights Defenders in 2011.

Former Prime Minister Amama Mbabazi is the first Ugandan presidential candidate to openly oppose homophobia. He ran in the 2016 presidential election and came third.

In August 2016, an LGBT event was brutally interrupted by police officers who violently attacked and beat the people present at the event, eventually arresting 16. In August 2017, the organisers of Pride Uganda had to cancel the event after threats of arrest by the police and the Government.

In November 2017, several police officers from the Kampala Metropolitan Police Area were ordered by police headquarters to attend a workshop on LGBT rights. A police spokesperson said: "What the training is aimed at, is to teach our field officers to appreciate that minorities have rights that should be respected."

In October 2019, 28-year-old Ugandan LGBT activist Brian Wasswa was beaten to death in his own home.

Public opinion

A 2007 Pew Global Attitudes Project poll found that 96 percent of Ugandan residents believed that homosexuality is a way of life that society should not accept, which was the fifth-highest rate of non-acceptance in the 45 countries surveyed. A poll conducted in 2010, however, revealed that 11 percent of Ugandans viewed homosexual behavior as being morally acceptable. Among other members of the East African Community, only 1 percent in Tanzania, 4 percent in Rwanda, and 1 percent in Kenya had the same view.

A 2013 Pew Research Center opinion survey showed that 96% of Ugandans believed homosexuality should not be accepted by society, while 4% believed it should. Older people were more accepting than younger people: 3% of people between 18 and 29 believed it should be accepted, 2% of people between 30 and 49 and 7% of people over 50.

In May 2015, PlanetRomeo, an LGBT social network, published its first Gay Happiness Index (GHI). Gay men from over 120 countries were asked about how they feel about society's view on homosexuality, how do they experience the way they are treated by other people and how satisfied are they with their lives. Uganda was ranked last with a GHI score of 20.

A poll carried out by ILGA found attitudes towards LGBT people had significantly changed by 2017: 59% of Ugandans agreed that gay, lesbian and bisexual people should enjoy the same rights as straight people, while 41% disagreed. Additionally, 56% agreed that they should be protected from workplace discrimination. 54% of Ugandans, however, said that people who are in same-sex relationships should be charged as criminals, while 34% disagreed. As for transgender people, 60% agreed that they should have the same rights, 62% believed they should be protected from employment discrimination and 53% believed they should be allowed to change their legal gender.  Additionally, according to that same poll, a third of Ugandans would try to "change" a neighbour's sexual orientation if they discovered they were gay.

Summary table

Notes

See also
 Human rights in Uganda
 Intersex rights in Uganda
 LGBT rights in Africa

References

External links
Statement of Vice President of Integrity Uganda, an Episcopal LGBT rights group.  Summary of issues facing LGBT people in Uganda
Ugandan media, politicians campaign against homosexuality. Carolyn Dunn, CBC News, last updated 26 Nov 2010.
Anti-Gay Fervor in Uganda Tied to Right-Wing US Evangelicals – video report by Democracy Now!
Exporting Homophobia: American far-right conservative churches establish influence on anti-gay policy in Africa Gay Ugandans face daily fear for their lives (Boise Weekly Feature – 8 Sep 2010)
"US Religious Right Behind Ugandas Anti-Gay Law Video Rev. Kapya Kaoma
 Slouching toward Kampala/ "History of Uganda's Anti Gay Bill and The American Religious Right Involvement"

LGBT rights in Uganda